Shahriar Nazim Joy is a Bangladeshi actor, writer, and director. He mainly appears in Bangladeshi television serials and films. He debuted in television in Godhuli Logne and debuted in films in Jiboner Golpo.

Works

Films

Web series

References

Further reading
 
 
 

Living people
Bangladeshi male film actors
Bangladeshi male television actors
21st-century Bangladeshi male actors
Bangladeshi television presenters
Year of birth missing (living people)